Dhamupur is a village in the Jakhania taluka of Ghazipur district in Uttar Pradesh State, India.

Notable personalities
 Company Quartermaster Havildar Abdul Hamid, who was posthumously awarded the Param Vir Chakra - India's highest gallantry award for displaying exemplary courage in the 1965 India-Pakistan war was born in this village.

References 

Villages in Ghazipur district